Luc Jalabert (27 August 1951 – 27 March 2018) was a French rejoneador. He was the director of the Arles Amphitheatre from 1999 to 2015, and a champion of bullfighting.

Early life
Jalabert was born on 27 August 1951 in Arles, France. His parents were fighting bull and thoroughbred breeders in Camargue.

Career
Jalabert began his career as a rejoneador in the Campo Pequeno bullring in Lisbon, Portugal on September 4, 1980. He competed in Portugal, Spain and France. He served as the director of the Arles Amphitheatre from 1999 to 2015. He also worked as an agent for bullfighters and event organizer.

Personal life and death
Jalabert resided in La Chassagne, a mas in Arles. He had two sons and a daughter.

Jalabert died on March 27, 2018, in Arles, at the age of 66. Shortly after his death, many bullfighters and rejoneadors praised his contributions to bullfighting. His funeral will be held at the Church of St. Trophime in Arles on 30 March 2018.

References

1951 births
2018 deaths
People from Arles
French bullfighters
Sportspeople from Bouches-du-Rhône